The 1885 Lafayette football team was an American football team that represented Lafayette College as an independent during the 1885 college football season. Playing without a regular coach, the team compiled a 3–2–1 record. John Hamme was the team captain, and E. Swift was the manager. The team played its home games on The Quad in Easton, Pennsylvania.

Schedule

References

Lafayette
Lafayette Leopards football seasons
Lafayette football